Shay Boland is the current manager of the Dublin GAA under-21 hurling team. He is a former inter county hurling player with Dublin GAA.

Boland managed the Dublin minor hurling team to two successive Leinster titles and two successive all-Ireland minor hurling finals in 2011 and 2012. Shay played as a corner back for the Dublin senior hurling team in the Leinster final against Kilkenny in 1991.

References 

 

Dublin inter-county hurlers
Living people
Year of birth missing (living people)
Hurling managers